The Xichang Satellite Launch Center (XSLC), also known as the Xichang Space Center, is a spaceport of China.

The facility became operational in 1984 and is used to launch numerous civil, scientific, and military payloads annually. It is notable as the site of Sino-European space cooperation, with the launch of the first of two Double Star scientific satellites in December 2003. Chinese officials have indicated interest in conducting additional international satellite launches from XSLC.

In 1996, a fatal accident occurred when the rocket carrying the Intelsat 708 satellite failed on launch from the Xichang Satellite Launch Center. Also, a 2007 test of an anti-satellite missile was launched from the center.

History

China's first crewed space program
In order to support the Chinese Project 714 crewed space program in the 1960s, the construction of a new space center at Xichang in the Sichuan province was decided, located farther from the Soviet border, thus safer. The Shuguang One spacecraft was expected to be launched from the launch pad number one. After the cancellation of the program, the launch pad was never completed. Today, a viewing platform for officials has been built at the site.

First Long March-2E carrier rocket
China launched its first Long March-2E carrier rocket on 16 July 1990, sending into orbit Pakistan's first indigenously developed Badr-1 satellite and HS-601.

1996 Launch accident

On 15 February 1996, a fatal accident occurred when the first new Long March 3B heavy carrier rocket carrying Intelsat 708 veered off course 22 seconds after launch, crashing 1200 meters away from the launch pad in a nearby mountain village, destroying 80 homes. According to the official report, six people died and 56 were injured. The number of civilian deaths has been disputed, with estimates of the number of casualties as around a few hundred.

China's first successful ASAT test

On 11 January 2007, China conducted an anti-satellite missile test with an SC-19 ASAT weapon.

The SC-19 has been described as being based on a modified DF-21 ballistic missile or its commercial derivative, the KT-2 with a Kinetic Kill Vehicle and is fully mobile.

Beginning of China's lunar exploration program

On October 24, 2007, Chang'e 1, an un-crewed Moon orbiter of the Chang'e program, was successfully launched from the facility, marking the beginning of China's lunar exploration program.

First Long March-3C carrier rocket

China launched its first Long March-3C carrier rocket on April 25, 2008. This was the 105th mission of China's Long March series of rockets, and also the launch of the nation's first data relay satellite (数据中继卫星) Tianlian I (天链一号).

A new launch pad for next-generation rockets (such as Long March 8) is currently under construction, as of December 2019.

Facilities

Launch Complex 1 (LC-1)
Not built Shuguang launch site, later used as a viewing area.

Launch Complex 2 (LC-2 or LA-2)
Used for launching Long March 2E, Long March 3A, Long March 3B and Long March 3C rockets.

Launch Complex 3 (LC-3 or LA-3)
Also known as LA-1. Used for launching Long March 2C, Long March 3, Long March 3A and Long March 3B rockets. Demolished and rebuilt between 2005 and 2006. Upgraded in order to support the Chinese Lunar Exploration Program. Demolished and rebuilt again between 2013 and 2015.

Technical Center
XSLC's Technical Center is equipped for testing and integration of the payload and launch vehicle. Two launch complexes at the facility support flight operations.

See also

 Chinese space program
 Jiuquan Satellite Launch Center
 Taiyuan Satellite Launch Center
 Wenchang Satellite Launch Center

References

External links
 Aerial Maps from Google Maps

Spaceports in China
Buildings and structures in Sichuan
Chinese space program facilities
Xichang